Cheryl is a four-member, semi-anonymous, cat-masked artist collective based in Brooklyn, New York, known for its video art, museum installations, participatory events and dance parties.  Cheryl originated in July 2008 in the Park Slope neighborhood of Brooklyn.  Since then, Cheryl has regularly produced thematic art/performance/dance events and installations in New York and in Europe.

Cheryl is best known for its thematic video work, often paired with an upcoming event of the same theme. Cheryl's work has been showcased through various installations and events with the Museum of Modern Art, MoMA PS1, the Whitney Museum of American Art, the Brooklyn Museum, Palazzo Strozzi, the Jewish Museum (New York), and the Bruce High Quality Foundation among others.

Cheryl has been featured in/on The New York Times, New York magazine, The New York Observer, Out magazine, V, W, Time Out, Black Book magazine, The Village Voice, Flavor magazine (Paris), Glamour (France), NBC and RAI among other outlets.

The Cheryl blurb 
 

The four elements of CHERYL are fake blood, glitter, shoulder pads, and hair extensions.

References 

 Time Out London article by Kate Hutchinson (2011-01-17), "New York's craziest party comes to town" Retrieved on 2011-03-08
 Art Observed article by Maddie Phinney (2010-11-13), "AO On Site Interview - New York: Performance Group CHERYL at Move!, MoMA PS1" Retrieved on 2010-12-6
 New York Observer article by Anthony Haden-Guest (2010-11-2), "(Art) Project Runway" Retrieved on 2010-12-6
 OUT magazine article by Jason Lamphier (2010-8-11), "CHERYL: Super Freaks" Retrieved on 2010-9-16
 Black Book magazine article by Eiseley Tauginas (2010-5-20), "Industry Insiders: CHERYL's Nick Schiarizzi as New Party Monster" Retrieved on 2010-9-16
 New York Magazine article by Catherine Coreno (2010-3-10), "Best of New York: Best Costume Party" Retrieved on 2010-9-16
 New York Times article by David Colman (2010-2-25), "Going Gaga" Retrieved on 2010-2-26
 Mooks article by Marisa Aveling (2010-2-19), "CHERYL TAKES YOU TO BIZARRO WORLD" Retrieved on 2010-2-26
 Time Out New York article by Ashlea Halpern (2010-2-8), "Most Stylish New Yorkers" Retrieved on 2010-2-26
 Time Out New York article by Beth Furtwängler (2009-11-26), "Quirky Parties" Retrieved on 2010-2-26
 Flavorwire article by Justin Wolf (2009-6-17), CHERYL Taps the Feline-Human Connection Retrieved on 2009-6-23
 New York Times Blog article by Andy Newman (2009-4-15), Beware of Dancing Mushrooms Retrieved on 2009-6-23
 Time Out New York article by Jonathan Shannon (2009-5-21), Tonight’s Last-Minute Plan: Ride your spirit pony to Cheryl’s Spirit Quest dance party Retrieved on 2009-6-23

External links 
 CHERYL's official home page
 CHERYL video page

American artist groups and collectives
Arts organizations based in New York City
Organizations based in Brooklyn
Arts organizations established in 2008
2008 establishments in New York City